The Staff Association for Royal Automobile Club Employees was a trade union in the United Kingdom. It merged with the Transport and General Workers' Union in 1978.

See also

 List of trade unions
 Transport and General Workers' Union
 TGWU amalgamations

References
Arthur Ivor Marsh, Victoria Ryan. Historical Directory of Trade Unions, Volume 5 Ashgate Publishing, Ltd., Jan 1, 2006 pg. 437

Defunct trade unions of the United Kingdom
Transport and General Workers' Union amalgamations
Trade unions disestablished in 1978